Big Brother Greece 5, was the fifth season of the Greek reality television series Big Brother. The show followed sixteen contestants, known as housemates, who were isolated from the outside world for an extended period of time in a custom built House. Each week, one or more of the housemates were evicted by a public vote. The last remaining housemate, Giannis Foukakis, was declared the winner, winning a cash prize of €170,000.

The season lasted 119 days and was presented by Roula Koromila. It launched on Alpha TV on October 3, 2010 and ended on January 30, 2011. As with other Alpha TV programs, the show also aired live in Cyprus through their affiliate Sigma TV.

Alpha TV was also partner with Greece's biggest pay tv provider NOVA Greece to launch a 23-hour Big Brother channel on their satellite platform. However, the show on NOVA was cut by ESR.

Production
Alpha TV announced in July 2010 that they have bought the rights to the Big Brother format, and aired their own revamped version in Fall 2010. After an open call for participants, a record 6,000 submissions were received by Alpha TV.

Housemates

Nominations table
Each week, housemates will nominate two of their fellow housemates for eviction. Housemates who are immune from nomination will be noted as "Exempt" for the week or weeks in which they are exempt.

Notes

References

2010 Greek television seasons
2011 Greek television seasons
05